The sixth season of One Million Star, a Taiwanese televised singing competition, began on November 6, 2009. Similar to previous seasons, the competition started with 100 participants, and most of the contents and rules remained unchanged. Altogether 27 episodes were aired.

Teams 
 Color key

Auditions

The Scrimmaging Rounds 
The Scrimmaging Rounds aired on 20, 27 November 2009 and 4, 11, 18, 25 December 2009.

Week 1: Team Phil VS. Team John (20 November)

Week 2: Team Anan VS. Team Adam (27 November)

The Regular Rounds

Week 1: Top 30 
The Top 30 was aired on Friday, 1 January 2010. Yuan Wei Jen, Kay Huang, Tiger Huang, Anan Zuo and Roger Cheng become the judges in this round. Each artist performed one song which is their "sure-win" choice. For those got 15 marks or above will be advanced to the next round. Otherwise, the failure area should be seated. With the original planning, four artists will be eliminated. After the consideration of the judges, with six leaving the competition. The remaining 25 artists will then move on the next round.

2009 television seasons
2009 in Taiwanese television